Paech'ŏn County is a county in South Hwanghae province, North Korea.

Administrative divisions
Paech'ŏn county is divided into 1 ŭp (town), 1 rodongjagu (workers' district) and 26 ri (villages):

Transportation
Paech'ŏn county is served by the Paech'ŏn Line of the Korean State Railway.

References

Counties of South Hwanghae